Gérard Hekking (24 August 1879 – 5 June 1942) was a French cellist.

Born in Nancy, he served as first cellist of the Concertgebouw Orchestra from 1903 until 1914. In 1912 Alphons Diepenbrock composed his Berceuse (Le Seigneur a dit à son enfant) for him and his wife, a soprano. Among the works premiered by Hekking were Fauré's First and Second Cello Sonatas, in 1917 and 1921 respectively. Hekking composed some works, including Villageoise, Joujou mécanique, Danse pour les Sakharoff and Danse campagnarde, all for cello and piano.

From 1927 until his death Hekking taught cello at the Paris Conservatoire. Among his students were Pierre Fournier, Maurice Gendron and Paul Tortelier.

Hekking died in Paris in 1942, aged 62. He was the cousin of André Hekking and the nephew of Anton Hekking, both cellists.

Notes

References
 
 

1879 births
1942 deaths
French classical cellists
Musicians from Nancy, France
Academic staff of the Conservatoire de Paris
Players of the Royal Concertgebouw Orchestra